Olav Dalsøren (born 8 September 1938) is a Norwegian ice hockey player. He played for the Norwegian national ice hockey team, and  participated at the Winter Olympics in 1964 and in 1968. He was awarded Gullpucken as best Norwegian ice hockey player in 1968.

References

External links

1938 births
Living people
Frisk Asker Ishockey players
Ice hockey players at the 1964 Winter Olympics
Ice hockey players at the 1968 Winter Olympics
Norway men's national ice hockey team coaches
Norwegian ice hockey players
Olympic ice hockey players of Norway
Ice hockey people from Oslo